This is a list of French television related events from 1980.

Events
23 March - Profil are selected to represent France at the 1980 Eurovision Song Contest with their song "Hé, hé M'sieurs dames". They are selected to be the twenty-fourth French Eurovision entry during a national final.

Debuts
27 February - Julien Fontanes, magistrat (1980-1989)
Dimanche Martin

Television shows

1940s
Le Jour du Seigneur (1949–present)

1950s

Présence protestante (1957-)

1960s
Les Dossiers de l'écran (1967-1991)
Les Animaux du monde (1969-1990)
Alain Decaux raconte (1969-1987)
Télé-Philatélie

1970s
Aujourd'hui Madame (1970-1982)
30 millions d'amis (1976-2016)
Les Jeux de 20 Heures (1976-1987)
1, rue Sésame (1978-1982)

Ending this year
Monsieur Cinéma (1967-1980)

Births
26 April - Laurent Ournac, actor & comedian
5 July - Lætitia Milot, actress & author
25 October - Laurie Cholewa, TV personality

Deaths

See also
1980 in France
List of French films of 1980